Nerve compression syndrome, or compression neuropathy,  or nerve entrapment syndrome, is a medical condition caused by direct pressure on a nerve. It is known colloquially as a trapped nerve, though this may also refer to nerve root compression (by a herniated disc, for example). Its symptoms include pain, tingling, numbness and muscle weakness. The symptoms affect just one particular part of the body, depending on which nerve is affected. Nerve conduction studies help to confirm the diagnosis. In some cases, surgery  may help to relieve the pressure on the nerve but this does not always relieve all the symptoms. Nerve injury by a single episode of physical trauma is in one sense a compression neuropathy but is not usually included under this heading.

Syndromes
 Upper limb

 Lower limb, abdomen and pelvis

Signs and symptoms
Tingling, numbness, and/or a burning sensation in the area of the body affected by the corresponding nerve.  These experiences may occur directly following insult or may occur several hours or even days afterwards. Pain is less common than tingling or numbness as a symptom of nerve entrapment, although a burning sensation, if it occurs, may (subjectively) be classified as pain.

Causes
A nerve may be compressed by prolonged or repeated external force, such as sitting with one's arm over the back of a chair (radial nerve), frequently resting one's elbows on a table (ulnar nerve), or an ill-fitting cast or brace on the leg (peroneal nerve). Part of the patient's body can cause the compression and the term entrapment neuropathy is used particularly in this situation. The offending structure may be a well-defined lesion such as a tumour (for example a lipoma, neurofibroma or metastasis), a ganglion cyst or a haematoma. Alternatively, there may be expansion of the tissues around a nerve in a space where there is little room for this to occur, as is often the case in carpal tunnel syndrome. This may be due to weight gain or peripheral oedema (especially in pregnancy), or to a specific condition such as acromegaly, hypothyroidism or scleroderma and psoriasis.

Some conditions cause nerves to be particularly susceptible to compression. These include diabetes, in which the blood supply to the nerves is already compromised, rendering the nerve more sensitive to minor degrees of compression. The genetic condition HNPP is a much rarer cause.

Pathophysiology
External pressure reduces flow in the vessels supplying the nerve with blood (the vasa nervorum). This causes local ischaemia, which has an immediate effect on the ability of the nerve axons to transmit action potentials. As the compression becomes more severe over time, focal demyelination occurs, followed by axonal damage and finally scarring.

Diagnosis
The symptoms and signs depend on which nerve is affected, where along its length the nerve is affected, and how severely the nerve is affected. Positive sensory symptoms are usually the earliest to occur, particularly tingling and neuropathic pain, followed or accompanied by reduced sensation or complete numbness. Muscle weakness is usually noticed later, and is often associated with muscle atrophy.

A compression neuropathy can usually be diagnosed confidently on the basis of the symptoms and signs alone. However, nerve conduction studies are helpful in confirming the diagnosis, quantifying the severity, and ruling out involvement of other nerves (suggesting a mononeuritis multiplex or polyneuropathy). A scan is not usually necessary, but may be helpful if a tumour or other local compressive lesion is suspected. Nerve injury, as a mononeuropathy, may cause similar symptoms to compression neuropathy. This may occasionally cause diagnostic confusion, particularly if the patient does not remember the injury and there are no obvious physical signs to suggest it.

Treatment
When an underlying medical condition is causing the neuropathy, treatment should first be directed at this condition. For example, if weight gain is the underlying cause, then a weight loss program is the most appropriate treatment. Compression neuropathy occurring in pregnancy often resolves after delivery, so no specific treatment is usually required. Some compression neuropathies are amenable to surgery: carpal tunnel syndrome and cubital tunnel syndrome are two common examples. Whether or not it is appropriate to offer surgery in any particular case depends on the severity of the symptoms, the risks of the proposed operation, and the prognosis if untreated. After surgery, the symptoms may resolve completely, but if the compression was sufficiently severe or prolonged then the nerve may not recover fully and some symptoms may persist. Drug treatment may be useful for an underlying condition (including peripheral edema), or for ameliorating neuropathic pain.

A textbook on massage states that massage can alleviate at least some entrapment symptoms:
The primary goal in treating nerve compression or tension pathology is to relieve adverse forces on the nerve. If soft tissue is binding or entrapping the nerve, reduce tension in that tissue so the nerve is no longer restricted. Use caution during treatment to ensure that additional pressure is not applied to the affected nerve, thereby aggravating symptoms. Soft-tissue treatment helps reduce the adverse compression or tension, but does not speed the healing of nerve pathologies, which are very slow to heal. However, creating an optimum environment for the body’s healing process is essential for the most efficient recovery process. Massage is an effective adjunct treatment to neural mobilization techniques, which are used to free bound or restricted nerves in neural tension disorders.

See also

References

External links 

Peripheral nervous system disorders
Syndromes affecting the nervous system